This article is about the number words of the Tamil language, as well as the dedicated symbols for them used in the Tamil script.

Basic numbering

Zero

But yet Modern Tamil renounces the use of its native character and uses the Indian symbol '0' for Shunya meaning nothingness in Indic thought.

first ten  numbers

Transcribing other numbers

Reproductive and attributive prefixes
Tamil has a numeric prefix for each number from 1 to 9, which can be added to the words for the powers of ten (ten, hundred, thousand, etc.) to form multiples of them. The prefix for nine changes with respect to the succeeding base 10.  + the unvoiced consonant of the succeeding base 10 forms the prefix for nine. For instance, 90 is  +  ( being the unvoiced version of ), hence).

These are typically void in the Tamil language except for some Hindu references; for example,  (the eight Lakshmis). Even in religious contexts, the Tamil language is usually more preferred for its more poetic nature and relatively low incidence of consonant clusters.

Specific characters
Unlike other Indian writing systems, Tamil has distinct digits for 10, 100, and 1000. It also has distinct characters for other number-based aspects of day-to-day life.

Powers of ten
There are two numeral systems that can be used in the Tamil language: the Tamil system which is as follows 

The following are the traditional numbers of the Ancient Tamil Country, .

Original Tamil system

Current Tamil system

Partitive numerals

Fractions
Proposals to encode Tamil fractions and symbols to Unicode were submitted. As of version 12.0, Tamil characters used for fractional values in traditional accounting practices were added to the Unicode Standard.

Transcribing fractions
You can transcribe any fraction, by affixing - (-il) after the denominator followed by the numerator.

The suffixing of the - requires you to change the last consonant of the number to its  form. For example,  +  ( + ) becomes ; note the  has been omitted.

Common fractions have names already allocated to them, hence, these names are often used rather than the above method.

Other fractions include:

 Aṇu was considered as the lowest fraction by ancient Tamils as size of smallest physical object (similar to an atom). Later, this term went to Sanskrit to refer directly to atoms.

Decimals
Decimal point is called  in Tamil. For example, 1.1 would be read as .in Sri Lankan Tamil Thasam தசம்

Percentage
These words are simply added after a number to form percentages. Percentage symbol (%) is also recognised and used.

Ordinal numbers
Ordinal numbers are formed by adding the suffix - after the number, except for 'First'.

Collective numerals

 As always, when blending two words into one,  an unvoiced form of the consonant as the one that the second starts with,  is placed in between to blend.

Traditional Tamil counting song

This song is a list of each number with a concept its primarily associated with.

Influence
As the ancient classical language of the Dravidian languages, Tamil numerals influenced and shaped the numerals of the others in the family. The following table compares the main Dravidian languages.

Also, Tamil through the Pallava script which itself through the Kawi script, Khmer script and other South-east Asian scripts has shaped the numeral grapheme of most South-east Asian languages.

History
Before the Government of India unveiled  as the new rupee symbol, people in Tamil Nadu used the Tamil letter  as the symbol. This symbol continues to be used occasionally as rupee symbol by Indian Tamils. It is also used by Tamils in Sri Lanka

It is written to invoke the god , known otherwise as Ganesha, who is the remover of obstacles.

See also
Tamil script
Tamil units of measurement

References

Tamil culture
Tamil language
Tamil numerals